Jency Stephany Ramírez Reyes (born 23 January 1994) is an American-born Salvadoran footballer who plays as a full back. She has been a member of the El Salvador women's national team.

Early life
Ramírez was born in Atlanta, Georgia and raised in the Lawrenceville suburb.

High school and college career
Ramírez has attended the Berkmar High School and the Clayton State University.

International career
Ramírez capped for El Salvador at senior level during the 2012 CONCACAF Women's Olympic Qualifying Tournament qualification and the 2018 CONCACAF Women's Championship qualification.

International goals
Scores and results list El Salvador's goal tally first

See also
List of El Salvador women's international footballers

References

1994 births
Living people
Citizens of El Salvador through descent
Salvadoran women's footballers
Women's association football fullbacks
El Salvador women's international footballers
Soccer players from Atlanta
People from Lawrenceville, Georgia
Sportspeople from the Atlanta metropolitan area
American women's soccer players
Clayton State Lakers athletes
College women's soccer players in the United States
American sportspeople of Salvadoran descent